Dominique Lacaud (born 4 February 1952 in Issoudun) is a French former racing driver.

References

1952 births
Living people
French racing drivers
24 Hours of Le Mans drivers
World Sportscar Championship drivers
People from Issoudun
Sportspeople from Indre
20th-century French people

BMW M drivers